GBA-12 (Shigar-I) is a constituency of Gilgit Baltistan Assembly. It is represented by Raja Muhammad Azam Khan of Pakistan Tehreek-e-Insaf.

Members

Election results

2009
Raja Muhammad Azam Khan of MQM became member of assembly by getting 10,520 votes. It was only seat won by MQM in 2009 election.

2015
Imran Nadeem of PPP won this seat by getting 10,422 votes. It is only seat won by Peoples Party in 2015 elections.

2020
Raja Muhammad Azam Khan of PTI won this seat by getting 10,621 votes.

References

Gilgit-Baltistan Legislative Assembly constituencies